Robyn Carlsson is a Swedish pop singer-songwriter.

Robyn may also refer to:

Music
 Robyn (album), 4th album of Swedish pop singer Robyn
 Robyn Is Here, debut album of Swedish pop singer Robyn

Other uses
 Robyn (name), includes a list of people with the name
 5183 Robyn, a main-belt asteroid

See also
Robbyn
Robin (disambiguation)